The Johnson County Museum of History is a local historical museum located in Franklin, Indiana. The museum is run by the Johnson County Historical Society. The museum officially opened in 1931, under the name "Johnson County Museum." It was organized by the local Chapter of the Daughters of the American Revolution.

Originally located in a small room at the county courthouse, the museum has grown over the years, making it necessary to relocate. In 1963 it moved to the Suckow home, and in 1989 it moved again to its current building.

About the Museum
The Johnson County Museum of History has been in existence since 1931. Originally, historical artifacts were on display in store windows in downtown Franklin. The local chapter of the Daughters of the American Revolution were able to organize efforts for a museum in 1931.

The original museum was located in a small room at the Johnson County Courthouse. The gallery was later moved to the Suckow home in Franklin in 1963. In 1989 Johnson County officials along with the Johnson County Historical Society combined to purchase the former Masonic Temple in Franklin located at 135 Main Street, and moved into the space in 1991. The museum is currently operating at the same address.

The museum currently offers permanent and seasonal exhibits, various programs and events, a genealogy library with original Johnson County and surrounding area records, a gift shop, and an 1830s cabin located next to the museum.

Permanent Exhibits
Early Inhabitants
Contains Native American artifacts, tools, weapons, and fur trade items.

Johnson County Pioneer Settlers
Contains original artifacts, Conestoga wagon reproduction, a replica fiddler with playable audio, and replica children's clothing.

Victorian Life
Contains a Victorian Parlor reproduction complete with clothing, furniture, and accessories.

Indiana Infantry in the Civil War
Contains original photographs and Civil War regalia, equipment and weaponry used in the war, and a mock encampment scene.

Serving County and Country
Contains memorabilia from the Spanish–American War to present day, historic items and photographs, authentic World War II attire, and historical contents from Camp Atterbury in nearby Edinburgh, Indiana.

The Fabulous '50s
Contains a replica diner scene, 1953 Chrysler Imperial, drive-in marquee, authentic 1950s popcorn machine used in the Artcraft Theatre, and other 1950s regalia.

Artwork
Includes works of art from local Johnson County artists past and present.

Genealogy Library
The museum has access to Johnson County records resources. The records include marriage record books, guardianship records, tax records, court records, inventory and sales records, military and veteran records, school yearbooks and records, local township records, written town histories, cemetery records, church records, oral histories, records from 28 surrounding counties and 11 states, and more.

Building
The museum's current building was designed by the architecture firm Shopbell, Fowler, and Thole and constructed as a Masonic Temple between 1922 and 1924 by Franklin Lodge No. 107 (a lodge of Freemasons) who used it as their meeting place until 1987.

The building was listed on the National Register of Historic Places in 1991. Although it had already been converted to a museum by that time, it is listed under the name Masonic Temple in the register.

References

External links
Johnson County Museum of History website

Clubhouses on the National Register of Historic Places in Indiana
Neoclassical architecture in Indiana
Buildings and structures completed in 1924
Former Masonic buildings in Indiana
Museums in Johnson County, Indiana
History museums in Indiana
National Register of Historic Places in Johnson County, Indiana